Tetradactylus tetradactylus, commonly known as the Cape long-tailed seps or longtail whip lizard, is a species of lizard in the family Gerrhosauridae.
The species is found in South Africa.

References

Tetradactylus
Reptiles described in 1802
Fauna of South Africa
Taxa named by François Marie Daudin